Lory State Park, is a state park located west of the city of Fort Collins, Colorado and is west of Horsetooth Reservoir and north of Horsetooth Mountain Park. Some of the park's more popular attractions include mountain biking, hiking, horseback riding and rock climbing. The park also contains its own bike park, which features dirt jumping, a pump track, and a skills area.

See also
Horsetooth Reservoir
Horsetooth Mountain
Fort Collins
Larimer County

References

State parks of Colorado
Protected areas of Larimer County, Colorado
Protected areas established in 1975
1975 establishments in Colorado